Nadjakov Glacier, Danco Coast 
 Narechen Glacier, Alexander Island
 Narezne Glacier, Loubet Coast
 Nauchene Nunatak, Graham Coast 
 Naiad Lake, Livingston Island
 Nebeska Peak, Sentinel Range
 Nebush Nunatak, Alexander Island
 Nedelya Point, Livingston Island  
 Nedev Peak, Oscar II Coast
 Negovan Crag, Trinity Peninsula 
 Nell Peak, Sentinel Range
 Neofit Peak, Smith Island  
 Nereid Lake, Greenwich Island
 Nesebar Gap, Livingston Island  
 Nesla Glacier, Graham Coast  
 Nessie Rock, Livingston Island
 Nestinari Nunataks, Livingston Island 
 Nestorov Island, South Orkney Islands 
 Nevestino Cove, Robert Island  
 Nevlya Peak, Greenwich Island  
 Nevsha Cove, Graham Coast
 Nicolai Peak, Alexander Island
 Nikola Peak, Sentinel Range
 Nikolov Cove, Smith Island
 Nikopol Point, Livingston Island 
 Nikudin Rock, Greenwich Island 
 Nikyup Point, Trinity Peninsula  
 Nishava Cove, Rugged Island  
 Nosei Glacier, Smith Island
 Nove Peak, Trinity Peninsula  
 Nusha Hill, Livingston Island

See also 
 Bulgarian toponyms in Antarctica

External links 
 Bulgarian Antarctic Gazetteer
 SCAR Composite Gazetteer of Antarctica
 Antarctic Digital Database (ADD). Scale 1:250000 topographic map of Antarctica with place-name search.
 L. Ivanov. Bulgarian toponymic presence in Antarctica. Polar Week at the National Museum of Natural History in Sofia, 2–6 December 2019

Bibliography 
 J. Stewart. Antarctica: An Encyclopedia. Jefferson, N.C. and London: McFarland, 2011. 1771 pp.  
 L. Ivanov. Bulgarian Names in Antarctica. Sofia: Manfred Wörner Foundation, 2021. Second edition. 539 pp.  (in Bulgarian)
 G. Bakardzhieva. Bulgarian toponyms in Antarctica. Paisiy Hilendarski University of Plovdiv: Research Papers. Vol. 56, Book 1, Part A, 2018 – Languages and Literature, pp. 104-119 (in Bulgarian)
 L. Ivanov and N. Ivanova. Bulgarian names. In: The World of Antarctica. Generis Publishing, 2022. pp. 114-115. 

Antarctica
 
Bulgarian toponyms in Antarctica
Names of places in Antarctica